The 68th season of the Campeonato Gaúcho kicked off on February 20, 1988 and ended on June 26, 1988. Fourteen teams participated. Holders Grêmio won their 26th title. Brasil de Pelotas and Guarany de Cruz Alta were relegated.

Participating teams

System 
The championship would have three stages.:

 First phase: The fourteen clubs were divided into two groups of seven. In the first round, teams from one group played against teams from the other group once. In the second round, the teams from each group played in single round-robin format against the others in their group. In each round, the two best teams in each group would dispute a knockout phase, played in one-legged ties, to define the round champions, who would receive one bonus point for the Final quadrangular. The six best teams in the sum of both rounds qualified into the Final hexagonal and all the non-qualified teams would play the Relegation tournament.
 Relegation Tournament: The eight remaining teams played each other in a double round-robin system; The teams that had finished 7th and 8th in the First round received two bonus points and the teams that had finished 9th and 10th received one bonus point. the two teams with the fewest points were relegated.
 Final hexagonal: The six remaining teams played each other in a double round-robin system; the team with the most points won the title.

Championship

First phase

First round

Group 1

Group 2

Semifinals 

|}

Finals 

|}

Second round

Group 1

Group 2

Semifinals 

|}

Finals 

|}

Final standings

Relegation tournament

Final hexagonal

References 

Campeonato Gaúcho seasons
Gaúcho